Denholm & McKay Co. was a department store located in Worcester, Massachusetts. The store was a dominant retailer in Central Massachusetts. The store was popularly known as Denholm's or the Boston Store. The company was founded by William Alexander Denholm in 1870. Denholm purchased the dry-goods business of Finley, Lawson, & Kennedy located on the corner of  Main and Mechanic street in Worcester. He partnered with Bostonian William C. McKay, which proved to be very successful. In twelve years Denholm and McKay had grown into a retailing giant. That year, the company moved into a new huge quarters specially built for them.  Denholm's held a reputation as the biggest store of its kind in New England outside Boston and Providence, Rhode Island.  In 1954 with Harry F. Wolf of Shrewsbury, Mass. as president from 1946-1966 (ref. The Story of Worcester's Premier Department Store) the old victorian style facade from 1882 was replaced with a new ultra-modern one, which remains mostly the same today. In 1963 Harry Wolf also has the first escalator installed in the city of Worcester to make shopping easier for customers. (ref. The Story of Worcester's Premier Department Store). Wolf was a perfectionist and one of the main reasons the store was so successful and profitable all those years. Sadly in 1966 with Wolf's passing the great store went into decline.(Ref. The Story of Worcester's Premier Department Store). In 1971, Denholm's opened its first and only branch at the Auburn Mall, just south of Worcester in Auburn, Massachusetts. In 1969, Gladdings Department Store of Providence merged with Denholm & Mckay. Both stores closed in 1973 due to bankruptcy. The store in downtown Worcester was converted into an office complex, but still bears the Denholm name. The store in the Auburn Mall was converted into a Forbes & Wallace of Springfield, Massachusetts.

References

External links
Blog about Denholm & McKay
Gone but Not Forgotten Denholm's

Defunct department stores based in Massachusetts
Retail companies established in 1871
Retail companies disestablished in 1973